KARD (channel 14) is a television station licensed to West Monroe, Louisiana, United States, serving the Monroe, Louisiana–El Dorado, Arkansas market as an affiliate of the Fox network. It is owned by Nexstar Media Group, which acquired the station in 2003 as part of its purchase of Quorum Broadcasting. Nexstar provides certain services to El Dorado–licensed NBC affiliate KTVE (channel 10) through a local marketing agreement (LMA) with Mission Broadcasting. Both stations share studios on Pavilion Road in West Monroe, while KARD's transmitter is located in Columbia, Louisiana.

In addition to its own digital signal, KARD is simulcast in high definition on KTVE's second digital subchannel (10.2) from its transmitter northwest of Huttig, Arkansas.

History

The station that became KARD first signed on on August 19, 1967 as KUZN-TV on channel 39 and was owned by Howard E. Griffith was a television counterpart of KUZN radio. This was Griffith's second foray into television, as he was the co-owner of Monroe's first TV station, KFAZ, which signed on in 1953 but went off the air the next year. The station aired a local newscast, the BBC series Panorama, and old Western movies. The station ceased operations on January 12, 1968 but was sold to Northeast Louisiana Broadcasting Corporation.

It resumed operations on August 31, 1970 as KYAY-TV. During this incarnation, KYAY, again, aired news and off-network Westerns and movies, as well as ABC, NBC and CBS programming not carried on KNOE and KTVE, such as That Girl, The Mod Squad, Hawaii Five-O, The Courtship of Eddie's Father, The Lawrence Welk Show, Engelbert Humperdinck, The NBC Tuesday Night Movie, and The Merv Griffin Show. KYAY proved to be no more successful than KUZN had been, and it also went dark, on August 16, 1971.

In 1974, the station returned with a new callsign, KLAA, a reallocation to channel 14, and became an NBC affiliate. Since 1972, when KTVE changed its affiliation to ABC, it and KNOE-TV carried selected NBC programs during the hours when their primary networks (CBS in KNOE's case) were not broadcasting (with some exceptions), but never the full NBC lineup. KLAA debuted on October 6, 1974, giving southern Arkansas and northeastern Louisiana full service from all "Big Three" networks for the first time ever. Today, channel 39 is occupied by KMCT-TV, a religious station, and that station now occupies KUZN/KYAY/KLAA/KARD's former studios.

On December 6, 1981, KLAA became an ABC affiliate, while KTVE retook the NBC affiliation that it held in the 1950s and 1960s. Exactly a year later, the station changed its calls to KARD, with the station manager citing the call sign change a reflection on the station's progress at the time. (Years later, the former KARD-TV in Wichita became a sister station to the current KARD upon the Nexstar/Media General merger in 2016.) In 1984, KARD's era of local ownership came to end when it was purchased by Woods Communications, owned by Charles Woods of Alabama. In 1986, Woods relocated the station's transmitter from its West Monroe studios to Caldwell Parish, Louisiana and increased the station's power to 5 million watts, making it Louisiana's first tall tower UHF station. This change enabled KARD to have at least Grade B coverage in a region encompassing all of Northeast Louisiana including portions of the Alexandria and Shreveport markets.

KARD began airing Fox programming when that network started up late at night in 1986 and in the same year was the first station in the Monroe area (and one of the first in Louisiana) to broadcast in stereo. In addition to KARD's secondary Fox affiliation, starting in 1991, Foxnet was available for cable subscribers in Monroe. In its last months as an ABC affiliate, KARD also preempted NYPD Blue due to concerns about that program's content. In 1993, Woods filed for bankruptcy, and Banam Broadcasting, a subsidiary of BankAmerica, assumed control of KARD. The next year, Banam dropped ABC to take Fox full-time, due to Fox picking up NFL football that season, and it was the first station in the nation to switch from a Big Three network to Fox during the U.S. television network affiliate switches of 1994, doing so April 17 that year, citing competition from the then-glut of stronger-rated ABC stations from outlying markets. Those surrounding ABC affiliates (mainly Alexandria's KLAX-TV and Shreveport's KTBS-TV) continued to be the main conduit for ABC in the market via antenna or cable carriage (KLAX even capitalized on its expanded footprint into the Monroe market during this time by branding itself on-air as "Louisiana's Superstation") until December 1998, when KAQY signed on. Banam sold KARD along with three of its stations (WTVW in Evansville, Indiana, KDEB in Springfield, Missouri, and KLBK-TV in Lubbock, Texas) to Petracom Broadcasting in 1995. In 1998, Petracom sold KARD to Quorum Broadcasting, which was absorbed by Nexstar in 2003.

In 2002, Piedmont Television, then-owner of KTVE, took over KARD's operations under a local marketing agreement (LMA). Despite KTVE being the senior partner, the two stations' operations were consolidated in KARD's newer facility in West Monroe. In addition to a common sales and promotions staff, the KTVE news department produces KARD's newscast. Piedmont's control of the duopoly officially came to an end on January 16, 2008, when KTVE was sold to Mission Broadcasting. This resulted in Nexstar, already the owner of KARD, taking over control of KTVE under a local sales agreement (LSA); the Internet presence of both stations were also merged into one website.

Programming
In addition to Fox network programming, KARD airs syndicated programs such as The Steve Wilkos Show, The Drew Barrymore Show, Hot Bench, The People's Court, Judge Mathis, The Wendy Williams Show, The Big Bang Theory, Family Feud, and Two and a Half Men, among others. KARD airs four hours of weekday newscasts—a two-hour morning newscast at 7 a.m., two half-hour weeknight newscasts at 5:30 p.m. and 6:30 p.m., and an hour-long newscast at 9 p.m. Its current generation of newscasts began in November 2001, shortly before it entered an SSA with KTVE.

Technical information

Subchannels
The station's digital signal is multiplexed:

In March 2009, KARD and KTVE informed the Federal Communications Commission that they needed to end analog operations sooner than June 12, 2009 (the earliest they could do so is April 16). KARD stated that a transmitter tube failed, bringing power down to 50%; KTVE claimed that its power was at 40%. Used parts were deemed unreliable, and staffers had to travel  to the transmitter from the studio; two to three visits per week were required to monitor the analog facilities, according to Nexstar. The FCC denied the request based on the fact that they are the last two analog channels in the market.

Analog-to-digital conversion
KARD shut down its analog signal, over UHF channel 14, on April 16, 2009. The station's digital signal remained on its pre-transition UHF channel 36. Through the use of PSIP, digital television receivers display the station's virtual channel as its former UHF analog channel 14.

References

External links

Fox network affiliates
Bounce TV affiliates
Grit (TV network) affiliates
Antenna TV affiliates
Television channels and stations established in 1974
1974 establishments in Louisiana
ARD
Nexstar Media Group